Luis Ricardo Reyes Moreno (born 3 April 1991), also known as El Hueso, is a Mexican professional footballer who plays as a left-back for Liga MX club Atlas.

Club career

Atlas
Reyes began his career at Atlas playing in their youth academy since 2008. After various loan spells to second and third tier teams in Mexico. Reyes made his first team debut in the first division with Atlas in a match against Toluca on 16 July 2016. After successful performances with the first team, he cemented his spot as a first-choice left-back, his performances during the Clausura 2017 season lead him to be included in the best XI of the league as well as a call-up to the national team.

América
On 18 May 2018, Reyes joined Club América.

International career
Reyes made his senior national team debut against Iceland on 8 February 2017, merely 7 months after playing in the third tier of Mexican football. Reyes was included in the final roster for those participating in the 2017 FIFA Confederations Cup held in Russia after only four appearances with the national team. After his participation in the Confederations Cup, he was also called to play in the 2017 CONCACAF Gold Cup.

Career statistics

International

Honours
América
Liga MX: Apertura 2018
Copa MX: Clausura 2019
Campeón de Campeones: 2019

Atlas
Liga MX: Apertura 2021, Clausura 2022
Campeón de Campeones: 2022

Individual
Liga MX Best XI: Clausura 2017, Clausura 2022
Liga MX All-Star: 2022

References

External links
 
  
 
 

1991 births
Living people
Mexico international footballers
Association football midfielders
Atlas F.C. footballers
Unión de Curtidores footballers
Tampico Madero F.C. footballers
Club América footballers
Atlético San Luis footballers
Liga MX players
Ascenso MX players
Liga Premier de México players
2017 FIFA Confederations Cup players
2017 CONCACAF Gold Cup players
Sportspeople from Monterrey
Footballers from Nuevo León
Mexican footballers